There have been three baronetcies created for persons with the surname Denny, one in the Baronetage of England, one in the Baronetage of Ireland and one in the Baronetage of the United Kingdom. As of 2014 two of the creations are extant.

The Denny Baronetcy, of Gillingham in the County of Norfolk, was created in the Baronetage of England on 3 June 1642 for William Denny. The title became extinct on his death in 1676.

The Denny Baronetcy, of Castle Moyle (sic) in the County of Kerry, was created in the Baronetage of Ireland on 12 January 1782 for Barry Denny. He was a descendant of Sir Anthony Denny, confidant of King Henry VIII. Burke's Peerage 1934 states that the letters patent creating the baronetcy were in error giving the title as of "Castle Moyle", instead of "Castle More" signifying Tralee Castle, the family seat in County Kerry. The second Baronet was about to be raised to the peerage when he was killed in a duel in 1794. The third and fourth Baronets represented Tralee in the House of Commons. The sixth Baronet was a founder of the North-West Mounted Police in Canada, Indian agent and author. The third son of the seventh Baronet was the artist Robyn Denny.   The Denny Earls of Norwich were members of another branch of the family.

The Denny Baronetcy, of Dumbarton in the County of Dunbarton, was created in the Baronetage of the United Kingdom on 16 June 1913 for the naval architect and shipbuilder Archibald Denny. He was a Director of William Denny & Brothers Ltd, shipbuilders and engineers, of Dumbarton. The second Baronet was President of William Denny & Brothers Ltd. The third Baronet was Chairman of the Air Registration Board.

Denny baronets, of Gillingham (1642)
Sir William Denny, 1st Baronet (died 1676)

Denny baronets, of Castle Moyle (1782)
Sir Barry Denny, 1st Baronet (–1794)
Sir Barry Denny, 2nd Baronet (died 1794)
Sir Edward Denny, 3rd Baronet (c. 1773–1831)
Sir Edward Denny, 4th Baronet (1796–1889)
Sir Robert Arthur Denny, 5th Baronet (1838–1921)
Sir Cecil Edward Denny, 6th Baronet (1850–1928)
Sir Henry Lyttelton Lyster Denny, 7th Baronet (1878–1953)
Sir Anthony Coningham de Waltham Denny, 8th Baronet (1925–2013)
Sir Piers Anthony de Waltham Denny, 9th Baronet (born 1954)

The heir presumptive is the present holder's younger brother, Thomas Francis Coningham Denny (born 1956).

Denny baronets, of Dumbarton (1913)
Sir Archibald Denny, 1st Baronet FRSE (1860–1936), shipbuilder
Sir Maurice Edward Denny, 2nd Baronet (1886–1955)
Sir Alistair Maurice Archibald Denny, 3rd Baronet (1922–1995)
Sir Charles Alistair Maurice Denny, 4th Baronet (born 1950)

The heir apparent is the present holder's only son Patrick Charles Alistair Denny (born 1985).

Notes

References
Kidd, Charles, Williamson, David (editors). Debrett's Peerage and Baronetage (1990 edition). New York: St Martin's Press, 1990,

External links
Biography of Sir Cecil Denny, 6th Baronet, at The Canadian Encyclopedia [deadlink]

Baronetcies in the Baronetage of Ireland
Baronetcies in the Baronetage of the United Kingdom
Extinct baronetcies in the Baronetage of England
1642 establishments in England
1782 establishments in Ireland
1913 establishments in the United Kingdom